The Nubi language (also called Ki-Nubi) is a Sudanese Arabic-based creole language spoken in Uganda around Bombo, and in Kenya around Kibera, by the Ugandan Nubians, many of whom are descendants of Emin Pasha's Sudanese soldiers who were settled there by the British colonial administration. It was spoken by about 15,000 people in Uganda in 1991 (according to the census), and an estimated 10,000 in Kenya; another source estimates about 50,000 speakers as of 2001. 90% of the lexicon derives from Arabic, but the grammar has been simplified, as has the sound system. Nairobi has the greatest concentration of Nubi speakers. Nubi has the prefixing, suffixing and compounding processes also present in Arabic.

Many Nubi speakers are Kakwa who came from the Nubian region, first into Equatoria, and from there southwards into Uganda and the Democratic Republic of the Congo. They rose to prominence under Ugandan President Idi Amin, who was Kakwa.

Jonathan Owens argues that Nubi constitutes a major counterexample to Derek Bickerton's theories of creole language formation, showing "no more than a chance resemblance to Bickerton's universal creole features" despite fulfilling perfectly the historical conditions expected to lead to such features.

Phonology

Vowels
There are five vowels in Nubi. Vowels are not distinguished by length except in at least two exceptions from Kenyan Nubi (which are not present in Ugandan dialects) where  means "outside" and is an adverb while  means "the outside" and is a noun, and also where  meaning "bewitch" is compared to  meaning "herd, cattle". Despite this, there is a tendency for vowels in stressed syllables to be registered as long vowels.

Each of the vowels has multiple allophones and the exact sound of the vowel depends on the surrounding consonants.

Consonants

Speakers may use Standard Arabic phonemes for words for which the Arabic pronunciation has been learned. The a retroflex version of the /r/ sound may also occur and some dialects use /l/ in its place. Geminates are very unusual in Nubi. These less common phonemes are shown in brackets.

Ineke Wellens gives the following orthography for Nubi where it differs from the IPA symbols: // = sh; /t/ = ch; // = j; // = ny; /w/ = w or u; /j/ = y or i; // = th; // = dh; /x/ = kh; // = ḥ.

Syllable Structure 
Syllables typically have a CV, VC, V or CVC structure with VC only occurring in initial syllables. Final and initial CC occur only in a few specific examples such as "skul" which means "school" or "sems" which means "sun".

Stress can change the meaning of words for example "saba" means "seven" or "morning" depending on whether the stress is on the first or second syllables respectively. Vowels are often omitted in unstressed, final syllables and sometime even the stressed final "u" in the passive form may be deleted after "m", "n", "l", "f" or "b". This can caused syllables to be realigned even across words.

Grammar

Nominals 
Nouns are inflected by number only (taking a singular or plural form) although for most nouns this does not represent a morphological change. Jonathan Owens gives 5 broad inflectional categories of nouns:
 Nouns which undergo a stress shift when the plural is formed.
 Nouns which undergo apophony.
 Nouns which take a suffix and undergo a stress shift in the plural form.
 Nouns which form the plural by suppletion
 Bantu loan-words which take different prefixes in the singular and plural forms
The table below shows examples of each type of pluralisation. The apostrophe has been placed before the stressed syllable:

1"Nuswan" may be supplemented by a suffix as if it were type 3, thus, "nuswana" could also mean "women".

Adjectives follow the noun and some adjectives have singular and plural forms which must agree with the noun. Adjectives may also take the prefixes "al", "ali", "ab" or "abu" which mark them as habitual. When a noun is a possessor follow the possessed noun and is mark with the particle "ta" which is placed between the two nouns. The particle can be omitted in what are called inalienable possessed nouns where it is clear that the latter possesses the former.

See also
 Bimbashi Arabic

Bibliography
 Bernd Heine (1982) The Nubi Language of Kibera – an Arabic Creole. Berlin: Dietrich Reimer.
 Boretzky, N. (1988). "Zur grammatischen Struktur des Nubi". Beiträge zum 4. Essener Kolloquium über Sprachkontakt, Sprachwandel, Sprachwechsel, Sprachtod, edited by N. Boretzky et al., 45–88. Bochum: Brockmeyer.
 Luffin, X., Un créole arabe : le kinubi de Mombasa, Kenya, Munich, Lincom Europa, 2005 (470 p.)
 Luffin, X., Kinubi Texts, Munich, Lincom Europa, 2004 (173 p.)
 Luffin, X., Les verbes d’état, d’existence et de possession en kinubi, Zeitschrift für Arabische Linguistik, Wiesbaden, Harrassowitz, 43, 2004 : 43–66
 Musa-Wellens, I. (1994) A descriptive sketch of the verbal system of the Nubi language, spoken in Bombo, Uganda. MA thesis, Nijmegen.
 Nhial, J. "Kinubi and Juba Arabic. A comparative study". In Directions in Sudanese Linguistics and Folklore, S. H. Hurriez and H. Bell, eds. Khartoum: Institute of African and Asian Studies, pp. 81–94.
 Owens, J. Aspects of Nubi Syntax.  PhD thesis, University of London.
 
 
 Owens, J. (1997) "Arabic-based pidgins and creoles". Contact languages: A wider perspective, edited by S.G. Thomason, 125–172. Amsterdam: John Benjamins.
 Wellens, Dr. I.H.W. (2001) An Arabic creole in Africa: the Nubi language of Uganda (Doctoral dissertation, Nijmegen).

References

Arab diaspora in Africa
Arabic-based pidgins and creoles
Languages of Kenya
Languages of Uganda
South Sudanese diaspora
Sudanese diaspora